Walter Butler of Polestown was High Sheriff of County Kilkenny, Ireland in 1483.

He was the second son of Sir Edmund MacRichard Butler. His nephew Piers would become the 8th Earl of Ormond. He was the father of Edmond Butler of Polestown.

See also
 Butler dynasty

References

Walter
15th-century Irish politicians